Andrei Sergeyevich Yegorychev (born 14 February 1993) is a Russian football player who plays for FC Ural Yekaterinburg. His primary position is right midfielder and he also plays as right back.

Career
He made his professional debut in the Russian Professional Football League for FC Vybor-Kurbatovo Voronezh on 25 July 2014 in a game against FC Arsenal-2 Tula.

He made his Russian Premier League debut for FC Ural Yekaterinburg on 3 March 2018 in a game against PFC CSKA Moscow.

Yegorychev reached the final of the 2018–19 Russian Cup with FC Ural Yekaterinburg.

Career statistics

References

External links
 
 

1993 births
Footballers from Voronezh
Living people
Russian footballers
Association football midfielders
FC Nosta Novotroitsk players
FC Ural Yekaterinburg players
Russian Premier League players
Russian Second League players